La Barberie is a brewery in the Saint-Roch district of Quebec City, Quebec, Canada. They have a few commerce points around the province of Quebec and are visible each year at the Mondial de la Bière in Montreal, Quebec.

Cooperative 

Founded in 1995 by Bruno Blais, Mario Alain and Todd Picard, this worker cooperative produces special beers for restaurants,  bars and cafés. All their beers are made in relatively small quantities and range from india pale ales to strong stouts. The name comes from Bruno's long beard.

Since 1997, a Tasting salon adjacent to the brewery is open to the public.

Since August 2002, it bottles and distributes many of its products in a numerous commercial points principally in Quebec.

Beers 

Ambrée aux piments
Rousse Bock
Claymore
Blonde à la chicoutai
Blanche aux mûres
Pale ale lime-framboises
Stout double chocolat
Ale nouvelle

Whites 
Blanche aux agrumes
Blanche classique
Blanche au miel de bleuets
Blanche de blé
Blanche au miel de fleurs sauvages
Blanche aux mûres
Blanche aux framboises
Blanche aux citrons

Blonds 
Blonde amère
Blonde de seigle
Blonde au miel d'été
Blonde biologique au chanvre
Blonde au chanvre
Blonde lime et gingembre
Blonde légère
Blonde légère au chanvre
Blonde aux cerises
Blonde à la menthe poivrée
Blonde forte au miel de bleuets
Blonde à l'argousier
Blonde bio à l'avoine grillée cream ale
Blonde au chanvre
Blonde biologique
Blonde aux pommes (saisonnière)
Blonde épicée
Blonde au miel
Extra stock ale

Ambers 
Ambrée houblonnée
Ambrée au chanvre
Ambrée aux piments forts
Ambrée Brasse-Camarade
Ambrée au miel de fleurs sauvages

Cuivrées 
Cuivrée aux agrumes
Cuivrée cream ale
Cuivrée à la citrouille
Cuivrée au coing
Cuivrée forte

Reds 
Bitter cream ale
Bock
Rousse au sarrasin
Rousse forte
Rousse bitter
Red ale
Rousse au chanvre biologique
Rousse au chanvre
Rousse bitter
Rousse au miel de sarrasin
Rousse légère et fruitée
Rousse légère

Brown 
Scotch ale
Brune à la mélasse
Brune forte aux épices (Claymore)
Brune épicée
Brune forte au miel

Black 
Stout impérial
Stout au café équitable
Stout aux mûres
Stout au cacao
Noire légère et fruitée
Noire chocolatée
Stout impérial russe
Stout classique
Stout au miel de sarrasin
Stout en rotation

Others 
Pale Ale rosée aux fruits
Pale ale aux fruits
Pale ale framboises et bleuets
Pale ale lime et framboise
Houblonnée en rotation
Forte en rotation
India Pale Ale
Pale Ale Anglaise

In bottle 
Blanche
Blonde biologique
India Pale Ale
Blanche aux mûres
Scotch ale
Rousse bitter
Stout Impérial
Brasse-Camarade
Rousse forte aux fruits

Personalized 
La Rougette
La Blonde de Saint-Sauveur
La Blanche de Saint-Sauveur
La Démente
La Riveraine double bock
La Corriveau (named after the legendary La Corriveau)
La Grande Réserve Brune
La Grande Réserve Pale ale aux petits fruits
Grand Duc
La Riveraine Brune Triple
Fruitée de St-Sauveur
Noire de St-Sauveur
La Riveraine Blanche aux framboises
La Pitoune
La Militante

Distinctions 

 2006 - Gold medal at the Mondial de la Bière for its blanche Weizen

See also
 Beer in Canada
 List of breweries in Canada

External links
Official site (in French)

Beer brewing companies based in Quebec
Companies based in Quebec City
Companies established in 1995
1995 establishments in Quebec